Kotzebue may refer to:

Surname
 Kotzebue (noble family), Baltic German and Russian noble family
 Alexander von Kotzebue (1815–1889), German-Russian Romantic painter, son of August von Kotzebue
 August von Kotzebue (1761–1819), German dramatist and writer
 Ludwig Kotzebue (born 1946), Dutch-Surinamese karateka
 Otto von Kotzebue (1787–1846), Baltic German navigator, son of August von Kotzebue
 Paul Demetrius von Kotzebue (1801–1884), Baltic German officer, son of August von Kotzebue
 Lidia Kotzebue (1885-1944) Romanian-Russian architect and sculptor; see Monument to the Heroes of the Air

Places in the United States
 Kotzebue, Alaska
 Kotzebue Sound, Alaska
 Kotzebue Air Force Station, Alaska

See also
 Kitzbühel